The GDR Volleyball Championship was an annual competition for men 's and women 's volleyball teams from the GDR. Held between 1951 and 1991. 

The championships were organized by the German Sports Volleyball Association of the GDR (Deutscher Sportverband Volleyball der DDR - DSVB ). Shortly after the unification of Germany in 1991, the volleyball federations of the GDR and FRG were also merged into a single German Volleyball Union. In the 1991/92 season, the first German unified championship was held .

Winners List Men

Winners List Women 

Sources

References

External links 
 Volleyball-Verband (DVV)

 

East Germany
1951 establishments in East Germany
Volleyball in East Germany
East Germany Women League